Sir Edward Julian Egerton Leigh (born 20 July 1950) is a British Conservative Party politician who has served as a Member of Parliament (MP) since 1983.

Leigh has represented Gainsborough, Lincolnshire in the House of Commons since 1983 (representing its predecessor constituency, Gainsborough and Horncastle, until 1997).

Leigh was knighted in the Queen's 2013 Birthday Honours for "public and political service", and has also received honours from the French and Italian Governments.

Initially dubbed "the Viscount" in parliamentary circles alluding to his landed gentry background, Leigh has a reputation at Westminster for his independence of mind as a "serial rebeller", who is prepared to vote against his own political party if it conflicts with his own principles. He was one of the original Maastricht Rebels and was reportedly sacked for organising Euro-rebels among ministers. In 2003 Leigh opposed military intervention in Iraq; he has since called for those who voted for the Iraq War, and are still seeking to justify their support for it, to be held to account.

He served as the Chairman of the Public Accounts Committee from 2001 to 2010, investigating government waste and seeking value for money in public expenditure. Leigh stepped down at the end of the parliamentary session in 2010, it being customary for an opposition MP to hold this post.

Leigh has edited and authored three books: Right Thinking (1988); The Nation That Forgot God (2008); and Monastery of the Mind (2012).

Early life

Leigh was educated at The Oratory School, the Lycée Français Charles de Gaulle (the French School in London) before going to University College, Durham, where he read History (BA) and was elected President of the Durham Union Society.

After graduating Leigh was called to the Bar at the Inner Temple and practised in arbitration and criminal law at Goldsmith Chambers (a barristers' chambers). He is a Fellow of the Chartered Institute of Arbitrators (FCIArb) and formerly served as a trooper  in the Honourable Artillery Company.

Family
His father, Sir Neville Leigh, hailed from the Cheshire family of West Hall, High Legh, a descendant of the Egertons, earls of Bridgewater.

His maternal grandfather was Colonel Cyril Denzil Branch, a French citizen, and he is a nephew of Prince Nikolai Golitsyn. 

He is also the third cousin of British comedian Al Murray.

Political career
Leigh first stood for Parliament at the October 1974 general election when he contested the safe Labour seat of Middlesbrough, but he was beaten by Arthur Bottomley.

Leigh worked in the private office of Margaret Thatcher from 1976 to 1977 as a political secretary when she was Leader of the Opposition. Leigh was elected to Richmond Borough Council and thereafter to the Greater London Council, serving as Councillor between 1974 and 1981.

In 1983, he was returned as MP for Gainsborough and Horncastle. A strong supporter of Margaret Thatcher, Leigh visited 10 Downing Street with fellow MP Michael Brown on the morning of Thatcher's resignation as Prime Minister in 1990 to try to persuade her to carry on. Although Charles Powell advised them it was a forlorn task, they were nonetheless granted access to the Cabinet which was in process at the time. Leigh and Brown departed 10 Downing Street and walked down Whitehall back to the House of Commons reputedly with "tears in their eyes". After Thatcher resigned, in the ensuing leadership election, Leigh supported Michael Heseltine, under whom he had served at the Department of Trade and Industry (DTI), preferring to support someone who had stabbed Thatcher in the front to those who had stabbed her in the back.

Leigh served as a Parliamentary Under-Secretary of State in John Major's ministry but was sacked in May 1993 over the stance he took by opposing the Maastricht Treaty. Whilst in office at the DTI he was a keen advocate of privatisation of the Post Office (opposed by Labour at the time but as the Royal Mail division attracting general bipartisan support and floated on the London Stock Exchange in 2013). In the following Conservative leadership election, Leigh supported John Redwood.

From 2001 until 2010, Leigh served as Chairman of the Public Accounts Committee, the principal parliamentary body auditing the Budget, investigating government waste and seeking value for money in public expenditure. During his two terms as Chairman, the PAC took evidence on 420 separate government projects and programmes and was responsible for saving the taxpayer over £4 billion.

In October 2006, Leigh was vocal in stating that after David Cameron had become leader of the party, core supporters were drifting away from voting Conservative. Nonetheless, his effective chairmanship of the Public Accounts Committee led to the rejuvenation of his parliamentary career.

Early in 2008, as Chairman of the PAC, he was embarrassed by relying on flawed Department for Transport (DfT) statistics to attack motorcyclists for tax evasion. He accused 38% of motorcyclists of evading vehicle excise duty. He later apologised for this following the admission by the DfT that 95.5% of motorcycles are entirely legal.

Leigh was President of the socially conservative Cornerstone Group representing the views of over 40 Conservative Members of Parliament and was author of the group's inaugural pamphlet Faith, Flag and Family in 2005.

From 2010 to 2011, Leigh served as an Independent Financial Advisor to HM Treasury, appointed by George Osborne to bring external challenge to the development and implementation of a new financial management strategy for central government. He stood down in 2011, but was then reappointed to report directly to the Chancellor of the Exchequer on improving Parliament's financial scrutiny of the Budget. He was a member of the Treasury Financial Reporting & Advisory Board and, in 2010, Leigh became a delegate to the Parliamentary Assembly of the Council of Europe, speaking regularly and serving on the Culture, Science, Education and Media Committee.

At the end of 2010 Leigh was offered but declined the British ambassadorship to the Holy See. Leigh also supported Boris Johnson's call to George Osborne in 2011 for lowering the rate of taxation in the UK so as to assist its economic recovery following the credit crunch. Leigh, an Assembly Member of the Council of Europe, opposed further human rights legislation, as proposed by the European Court of Human Rights.

In 2011, Leigh was appointed Chairman of the Public Accounts Commission, the body which audits the National Audit Office.

In 2012, Leigh, together with a record number of fellow Conservative MPs, including numerous Privy Counsellors, successfully voted against the Coalition Government's attempted railroading of House of Lords Reform by limiting time for meaningful parliamentary debate on this major constitutional issue.

In September 2014, Leigh criticised the Government's decision to allow mitochondrial replacement therapy to prevent the birth of the children with incurable diseases such as muscular dystrophy. These diseases affect up to 1 in 6,500 babies which Leigh stated could lead to people being “harvested for their parts" and a divide between what he referred to as "the modified and the unmodified". The Department for Health asserted no genetic modification is involved.

In 2015, the French President appointed him to the Légion d'honneur for his role as “a bridge between our parliaments, our governments and our societies”, as stated by Ambassador Sylvie Bermann at his investiture.

In March 2016, he joined three other Conservative MPs in "talking out" a Bill introduced by Green Party MP Dr Caroline Lucas, which aimed to reverse moves to privatise the NHS. By filibustering for three and a half hours, Lucas was left with just 17 minutes to present her Bill, which was subsequently shelved without a vote.

One of 21 MPs who, in March 2019, voted against LGBT-inclusive sex and relationship education in English schools, Leigh was reelected with a large majority at the 2019 general election.

In August 2020, Leigh suggested that the UK take back Calais to prevent migrants seeking asylum by crossing the English Channel from France.

On 1 March 2022, Leigh praised Home Secretary Priti Patel's 'proportionate response' over admission of refugees into the UK from the Russian invasion of Ukraine. Speaking in Parliament, Leigh also urged Patel, "To listen to the voices of people from, for instance in Lincolnshire, where we feel we have done our bit in terms of migration from eastern Europe where we are under extreme pressure in terms of housing and jobs." Leigh was subsequently criticised for these remarks by Labour councillors on Lincolnshire County Council.

Beliefs
Leigh believes in repealing the Human Rights Act, to get out of the European Refugee Convention and repeal the Modern Slavery Act so that people can be detained and deported.

Leigh is a Roman Catholic, and maintains a personal blog containing Thoughts from a Christian perspective. He is a Patron of the Latin Mass Society, which promotes the use of the 1962 form of the Mass. He has argued for tightening of abortion law regarding human embryonic research. He was on the losing side in defence of Section 28 and opposed the Civil Partnership Act 2004, voting against it in Parliament at its Second Reading. Leigh later proposed an amendment to extend the property and pension rights afforded by civil partnerships to siblings who had lived together for more than 12 years. This was opposed by many backers of the initial Bill, such as fellow Conservative MP Sir Alan Duncan, who dubbed it a wrecking amendment.

Following an interim report on the connections between colonialism and properties now in the care of the National Trust, including links with historic slavery, Leigh was among the signatories of a letter to The Telegraph in November 2020 from the "Common Sense Group" of Conservative Parliamentarians. The letter accused the National Trust of being "coloured by cultural Marxist dogma, colloquially known as the 'woke agenda'".

Leigh identifies as a Thatcherite and believes in "free enterprise, deregulation, low taxation and a smaller state". In June 2018 he suggested reforming the National Health Service, stating: "I personally feel we have to look at social insurance, which they have in France and Germany, because there is no room for increases in general taxation."

Opposition to Conservative leadership
On a number of occasions Leigh has voted against the leadership of his party where it conflicts with his personal principles. In 2003, Leigh rebelled against the leadership of his own party and the Labour government to oppose military intervention in Iraq in 2003. He was one of only 15 Conservative rebels who opposed it at the time.

Since the 2016 European Union Referendum, Leigh has supported Brexit.

In October 2017, the House of Commons overwhelmingly passed an Opposition motion to delay the introduction of Universal Credit and iron out problems with the system first. Leigh strongly criticised the Government decision to ignore the vote, stating: "the road to tyranny is paved by executives ignoring parliaments."

Speakership elections
A veteran backbencher, Leigh was encouraged to run for the Speakership of the House of Commons, and after the 2010 general election for one of the Deputy Speakerships, but chose not to stand then as parliamentary convention was that governing party members were not to be elected to such offices unless already in situ.

Leigh ran for the Speakership of the House of Commons in 2019 after Speaker John Bercow retired; he stated that, if elected Speaker, he would be fair to all sides and assume a traditional role. He was eliminated after receiving 12 votes in the first ballot.

All-Party Parliamentary Groups
Fluent in French, Leigh currently serves as Chairman of the All-Party Parliamentary Group on France and the All-Party Parliamentary Group on Italy, delivering a speech in Italian at the Palace of Westminster to visiting Deputies of the Italian Parliament. He is also the Chairman of the new All-Party Parliamentary Group on Russia, Secretary of the All-Party Parliamentary Group on Insurance, and Chairman of the Foreign Affairs, Defence, and International Development subcommittee of the 1922 Committee.

Honours
Leigh was knighted in 2013 for "public and political service",
  Knight Bachelor (2013)
  Officier of the Légion d'honneur (2015)
  Commander of the Order of the Star of Italy (2017)
  Knight of Honour and Devotion of the Sovereign Military Order of Malta (1994)
  Privy Counsellor (2019).

Personal life
Leigh married Mary Goodman in London on 25 September 1984; the great granddaughter of Duke Georg Alexander of Mecklenburg-Strelitz through her mother, and the great-granddaughter of Lady Ottoline Morrell through her father.

Sir Edward and Lady Leigh have six children (Natalia, Tamara, Benedict, Marina, Nicholas, and Theodore) and divide their time between homes in Westminster and in his Lincolnshire constituency. Their three eldest children work for HM Government as civil servants.

Leigh has the skin condition rosacea and spoke out in March 2020 about being mocked on social media for his appearance.

See also
 List of MPs elected in the 1983 United Kingdom general election
 List of Durham University people
 List of presidents of the Durham Union

References

External links

 Sir Edward Leigh MP official website
 Another Country - personal blog containing 'Thoughts from a Christian perspective'
 
 Debrett's People of Today
 Public Accounts Committee

|-

1950 births
Living people
20th-century English lawyers
Alumni of University College, Durham
Conservative Party (UK) MPs for English constituencies
English Roman Catholics
English barristers
English people of Norman descent
Honourable Artillery Company soldiers
Knights Bachelor
Knights of Malta
Members of the Greater London Council
Members of the Inner Temple
Members of the Privy Council of the United Kingdom
Officiers of the Légion d'honneur
People educated at Lycée Français Charles de Gaulle
People educated at The Oratory School
Politicians awarded knighthoods
Presidents of the Durham Union
Recipients of Italian civil awards and decorations
UK MPs 1983–1987
UK MPs 1987–1992
UK MPs 1992–1997
UK MPs 1997–2001
UK MPs 2001–2005
UK MPs 2005–2010
UK MPs 2010–2015
UK MPs 2015–2017
UK MPs 2017–2019
UK MPs 2019–present
British Eurosceptics